Paracloeodes is a genus of small minnow mayflies in the family Baetidae. There are at least 20 described species in Paracloeodes.

Species
These 21 species belong to the genus Paracloeodes:

 Paracloeodes assu Nieto & Salles, 2006 c g
 Paracloeodes atroari Nieto & Salles, 2006 c g
 Paracloeodes binodulus Lugo-Ortiz & McCafferty, 1996 c g
 Paracloeodes caldensis g
 Paracloeodes charrua Emmerich & Nieto, 2009 c g
 Paracloeodes eurybranchus Lugo-Ortiz & McCafferty, 1996 c g
 Paracloeodes fleeki McCafferty and Lenat, 2004 i c g
 Paracloeodes ibicui Lugo-Ortiz & McCafferty, 1996 c g
 Paracloeodes leptobranchus Lugo-Ortiz & McCafferty, 1996 c g
 Paracloeodes lilliputian Kluge, 1991 c g
 Paracloeodes lotor g
 Paracloeodes lugoi Randolph and McCafferty, 2000 i c g
 Paracloeodes minutus (Daggy, 1945) i c g b
 Paracloeodes morellii Emmerich & Nieto, 2009 c g
 Paracloeodes pacawara Nieto & Salles, 2006 c g
 Paracloeodes peri Nieto & Salles, 2006 c g
 Paracloeodes poranga (Salles & Lugo-Ortiz, 2003) c g
 Paracloeodes portoricensis (Traver, 1938) i c g
 Paracloeodes quadridentatus Lima & Salles, 2010 c g
 Paracloeodes waimiri Nieto & Salles, 2006 c g
 Paracloeodes yuto Nieto & Salles, 2006 c g

Data sources: i = ITIS, c = Catalogue of Life, g = GBIF, b = Bugguide.net

References

Further reading

 
 
 
 
 
 
 

Mayfly genera
Insects of Europe